Kerala State Development Corporation for Christian Converts from Scheduled Castes and the Recommended Communities is a Government of Kerala undertaking located at Kottayam which provides financial help to Christian converts.

History
The body was incorporated in 1980 under the Companies Act 1956 and lists its main objectives as "to promote the comprehensive social, educational, cultural and economic upliftment and other living conditions of the Christian Converts from Scheduled Castes and the Recommended Communities".

Welfare schemes
The body provides micro-financing, marketing support for various products manufactured as part of the schemes at its margin-free shops and free scholarships exclusively for students belonging to Christian converts from Scheduled Castes and the Recommended Communities.

In 2010, A.K. Balan the Minister of Welfare of Scheduled Castes/ Scheduled Tribes and Backward Classes launched a loan waiver scheme which
waived off ₹159 crore loans of one lakh people.

Constitutional validity
Critics have labelled the body in "complete violation of the Constitution" for discriminating on religious grounds violating secular constitution of India.

As per para 3 of the Constitution order (Scheduled Castes) 1950, only persons belonging to Hindu, Sikh and Buddhist faiths can claim SC status. Hence formation of this Corporation is unconstitutional.

References

External links

State agencies of Kerala
1980 establishments in Kerala
Government welfare schemes in Kerala
Government-owned companies of Kerala
Minorities-focussed government initiatives in India
Christianity in Kerala
Scheduled Castes
Government agencies established in 1980